Raurava denotes a hell in
 Naraka (Hinduism)
 Naraka (Buddhism)